James Smyth may refer to:

 Sir James Smyth (English MP) (c. 1621–1681), English Member of Parliament for Exeter and Camelford
 Sir James Smyth, 1st Baronet (c. 1686–1717), Sheriff of Sussex 1714–15
 James Smyth (Irish MP) (c. 1716–1771), Irish Member of Parliament for Antrim and Dundalk
 James Smyth (priest) (1683–1799), Anglican priest in Ireland
 James Carmichael Smyth (physician) (1742–1821), Scottish medical writer and physician to King George III
 Sir James Carmichael-Smyth, 1st Baronet (1779–1838), his son, British colonial administrator
 James Adger Smyth (1837–1920), mayor of Charleston, South Carolina
 Red Smyth (James Daniel Smyth, 1893–1958), American baseball player
 James G. Smyth (fl. mid-20th century), American politician
 Jimmy Smyth (hurler) (1931–2013), Irish hurler

See also
 James Smythe (disambiguation)
 James Smith (disambiguation)